Transvestic fetishism is a psychiatric diagnosis applied to men who are thought to have an excessive sexual or erotic interest in cross-dressing; this interest is often expressed in autoerotic behavior. It differs from cross-dressing for entertainment or other purposes that do not involve sexual arousal. Under the name transvestic disorder, it is categorized as a paraphilia in the DSM-5.

Description 
The DSM-5 states that adolescent and adult males with late-onset gender dysphoria "frequently engage in transvestic behavior with sexual excitement." "Habitual fetishistic transvestism developing into autogynephilia" is given as a risk factor for gender dysphoria to develop.

According to DSM-IV, this fetishism was limited to heterosexual men; however, the DSM-5 does not have this restriction, and opens it to women and men with this interest, regardless of their sexual orientation. It is, however, usually documented in males.

There are two key criteria before a psychiatric diagnosis of "transvestic fetishism" is made:
 Individuals must be sexually aroused by the act of cross-dressing.
 Individuals must experience significant distress or impairment – socially or occupationally – because of their behavior.

Types

Some male transvestic fetishists collect women's clothing, e.g. panties, nightgowns, babydolls, bridal gowns, slips, petticoats, brassieres, and other types of nightwear, lingerie, stockings, pantyhose, shoes, and boots, items of a distinct feminine look and feel, especially of silk, satin and lace. They may dress in these feminine garments and take photographs of themselves while living out their fantasies.

See also 
 Dual-role transvestism
 Feminization
 Hair fetishism
 List of transgender-related topics
 List of paraphilias
 Pinafore eroticism
 Transgender
 Transvestism

References
Citations

Sources
 

Cross-dressing
Fashion-related fetishism
Paraphilias
Sexual fetishism
Sexual roleplay
Gender identity